In enzymology, a galactitol 2-dehydrogenase is an enzyme that catalyzes the chemical reaction

galactitol + NAD+  D-tagatose + NADH + H+

Thus, the two substrates of this enzyme are galactitol and NAD+, whereas its 3 products are D-tagatose, NADH, and H+.

This enzyme belongs to the family of oxidoreductases, specifically those acting on the CH-OH group of donor with NAD+ or NADP+ as acceptor. The systematic name of this enzyme class is galactitol:NAD+ 2-oxidoreductase. This enzyme is also called dulcitol dehydrogenase. This enzyme participates in galactose metabolism.

References 

 

EC 1.1.1
NADH-dependent enzymes
Enzymes of known structure